Leslie Patrick Willis (2 May 1922 – 27 May 1985) was an  Australian rules footballer who played with St Kilda in the Victorian Football League (VFL).

Notes

External links 

1922 births
1985 deaths
Australian rules footballers from Melbourne
St Kilda Football Club players
Australian Army personnel of World War II
Australian Army soldiers
People from Thornbury, Victoria
Military personnel from Melbourne